Nomen mysticum is a Latin term meaning "mystical name". It is the name that a member of a mystical organization is given once they are a confirmed member of that organization.

Initiation
Usually the secret name is not given to the neophyte directly, but only after the completion of initiation. The connection between the initiation and the presentation of a secret name is considered a rite of passage by most esoteric orders.  It is understood that the process represents the mystery of rebirth.

Notable mystical names
 Sar Alden: Harvey Spencer Lewis, F.R.C., S.·.I.·., 33°66°95°, Ph.D., in FUDOSI
 Sar Validivar: Ralph Maxwell Lewis, F.R.C., in FUDOSI
 Sar Hieronymus: Emile Dantinne in FUDOSI
 Sar Yesir: Victor Blanchard in FUDOSI

See also
 Craft name
 Magical motto
 Pseudonym
 Religious name

References

Latin words and phrases
Esotericism